Raw Power Live: In the Hands of the Fans is the final live album by Iggy & The Stooges recorded at All Tomorrow's Parties Festival on Friday, September 3, 2010 at Kutshers Country Club, Monticello, NY. It was released to coincide with Record Store Day, April 16, 2011, on 180 gram vinyl. The album was later released on iTunes.

Track listing

"Raw Power"
"Search and Destroy"
"Gimme Danger"
"Your Pretty Face Is Going to Hell"
"Shake Appeal"
"I Need Somebody"
"Penetration"
"Death Trip"
"I Got a Right"

Personnel
Iggy Pop – vocals
James Williamson – guitar
Mike Watt – bass guitar
Scott Asheton – drums
Steve Mackay – saxophone

References

External links 
 
 Blabbermouth.net review

2011 live albums
The Stooges albums
Virgin Records live albums